The following is a list of the MTV Europe Music Award winners and nominees for Best Taiwanese Act.

2010s

Taiwanese Act
Awards established in 2013
Taiwanese music